is a Japanese professional handballer who plays as a right wing for Liga Națională club Minaur Baia Mare and the Japan national team.

Achievements 
Handball-Bundesliga:
Winner: 2020
Asian Championship:
Silver Medalist: 2017, 2018
Asian Games:
Bronze Medalist: 2018

References

External links

 

1996 births
Living people
Sportspeople from Osaka
Japanese female handball players
Handball players at the 2018 Asian Games
Asian Games bronze medalists for Japan
Asian Games medalists in handball
Medalists at the 2018 Asian Games
Expatriate handball players
Japanese expatriate sportspeople in Germany
Japanese expatriate sportspeople in Romania
CS Minaur Baia Mare (women's handball) players